IL4, Il-4, or IL-4 may refer to:
 Ilyushin Il-4, a Soviet World War II bomber
 Interleukin 4, a cytokine that stimulates the proliferation of activated B-cells
 Illinois's 4th congressional district
 Illinois Route 4